Siby Varghese better known by his stage name Kailash, is an Indian actor who works in the Malayalam Cinema. He has acted in more than 50 films. Known for his appearance as the lead in Lal Jose's remake film Neelathamara, he starred in the last installment of T. V. Chandran's trilogy Bhoomiyude Avakashikal, which was premiered at the 43rd International Film Festival of India and IFFK.

Career

His debut film was Parthan Kanda Paralokam in which he appeared in a supporting role. He also played the lead role in Malayalam film Neelathaamara (2009) by Lal Jose. He acted in notable roles in the films Shikkar, The Hunt, Banking Hours 10 to 4, 10:30 am Local Call and Thank You.

Bhoomiyude Avakashikal by T. V. Chandran, a movie in which Kailash played the lead role, was screened at several international film festivals. He was met with wide acclaim for his sensitive and nuanced performance.

Filmography

Dubbing

Telefilm

References

External links 
 

Indian male film actors
Living people
Male actors from Kochi
Male actors in Malayalam cinema
People from Thiruvalla
1992 births